Claremont High School may refer to:

Claremont High School (California), in Claremont, California
Claremont High School Historic District, listed on the National Register of Historic Places in Catawba County, North Carolina
Claremont High School (Cape Town), South Africa
Claremont High School (Tasmania), Australia
Claremont High School, Kenton, London, England
Claremont High School, East Kilbride, South Lanarkshire, Scotland

See also 
Clairemont High School
Claremont School (disambiguation)
Claremont (disambiguation)